Roadies Revolution is the seventeenth season of India MTV Roadies, which premiers on MTV on February 15, 2020. Prince Narula, Nikhil Chinapa, Neha Dhupia and Raftaar (Varun Sood replaced him mid season) returned as Leaders while Rannvijay Singh continues as the host.

In this season, there is no gang leader nor any gang. The contestants are going to fight solo during their journey right from the beginning. In the previous seasons from Roadies X2 contestants are grouped into gangs under a gang leader to perform their tasks and they fight solo towards the end of the show.

For the very first time, the show is being streamed on Voot 24hr before TV steaming platform a day before the TV which is made exclusively available only to Voot Select subscribers.

After six episodes, due to COVID-19 pandemic, the show dates were postponed until further instructions from March 28.

For the first time in Roadies history, Audition happened LIVE on social media platform during the COVID-19 Lock-down in India, from April 27 to June 17, where one auditionee won the chance to join the Roadies Journey.

After three months, the show was resume from June 27, 2020 onwards and telecasted new episodes.

Leaders 
Ranvijay Singha is presenting the show while Prince Narula, Nikhil Chinapa, Neha Dhupia and Raftaar served as the leaders of MTV Roadies Revolution.

Raftar earlier had to leave the show because of his upcoming album.So he was replaced by Varun Sood.Later He was tested COVID-19 positive. That's why he also couldn't be there after resume of the show.

Roadies badges 
Roadies Badge is being introduced in this season, the stars on the badge will help the leaders to reach the Finale. Stars earned by the end of Episode 34:

Revolution Factor 
This season the Roadies and Leaders participated in various Task throughout the Journey, to win money to help people in need.

Due to COVID-19 pandemic in India, 6 months later, the journey resumed with all safety measure in a Bio Bubble. Therefore, from the Tenth Task onwards, no Donation/Contribution were made.

Auditions  Episode 1 to 9 
MTV Roadies Revolution Auditions were held at Delhi on 5 January

 Chandigarh on 7 January, Kolkata on 11 January 2020, and Pune on 15 January 2020. In an interview with Zoom Digital, Neha Dhupia said, "This season of Roadies is called Roadies Revolution. It is 2020 and I feel we all should raise our voices for things that are absolutely right and if the youth is not ready to raise their voice then who is? As per our last experiences, I feel that youth is ready to raise their voice. As a leading youth channel, I can promise that we will try our level best to start a revolution, to start a little spark if nothing else".
Ranvijay Singha, when asked in Kolkata press conference, "It's wonderful to have you back in Calcutta for the 'Roadies' auditions after three years. Why the gap in between, considering you had told us earlier that you have got some of your best contestants over various editions from this part of the country?", said, "I don't take Roadies for granted. The contestant who wants to be a Roadie will come from America.

The contestants had to get a least of 3 votes from the leaders and Rannvijay had a special power to cast 2 votes.

 Ex-Contestant from MTV Roadies Rising

Facebook auditions 
Auditions were held on the Facebook page of Colors TV and MTV Roadies every week, where Rannvijay audition the contestants. These contestants have auditioned by other judges during the week. ( represents the judge who was a part of the auditions that day.)The selected contestants were revealed on MTV India on Saturdays, 7pm.

DJ Skip joined the LIVE Auditions to add music to the Auditions.

LIVE Auditions Finale Vote-out

Culling  Episode 9 & 10 

Total: 
Male = 12
Female = 8

 Note

Journey - Rishikesh  Episode 11 to 17 
Sehej couldn't join the journey as she was absent due to her international sports championship. She was replaced by Kakoli.

Rannvijay then announced that the Leaders will lose their stars, if the Roadies they predicted in the Auditions, didn't make it to the journey.

First Task: Panch Tantra 
Leaders had to select one Roadies to start off the task and then it was up to them to choose which roadie they wanted to be a part of their team who were chained at each stage. The starting roadie is as follows:

The task was based on the 5 senses of the human body and they had to perform by selection chain basis. At the end of the task teams were (listed by the senses they were chained at):

Though the winning team started for Neha, they selected Raftaar in the end by which he won the task and received one star and Team A became immune.

The team coming in second choose Prince, he had the power to save one Roadie from their team to be immune, he eventually chose Pratibha.

Second Task: Meal Mile Ke 
In this task contestants had to prepare meals for school children. 14 non-immune Roadies along with Leaders - Prince, Neha and Nikhil will compete to earn 8 immunities. And the 6 immune Roadies along with Rannvijay and Raftaar will also be participating to steal immunity from them.

Each kid from the school had coupons, the Roadies had to earn the coupons from them by selling food or by entertaining them through their talents . 40 coupons will equal to 1 immunity, i.e., 320 coupons will equal to 8 immunities.

At the Vote-out, Raftaar got a chance to choose who will distribute immunity.  He chose Nikhil and Prince. Nikhil choose Akash, Apoorva, Hamid and Tarandeep, while Prince choose Vipin, Sapna, Nisha and Saqib to give immunity.
But previously immune roadies stole the immunity of Sapna, Nisha, Saqib which put them in danger of going home along with the non-immune roadies.

Third Task: Yoga Naw
Before the start of the task, the roadies were woken early morning to be trained by a Yoga teacher about the various asans which was a part of the task.

The leaders competed in a mini task to get an advantage in the task first and choose order of other Leaders. Nikhil won advantage and he choose himself to go first, Prince second, Raftaar third and Neha fourth. The advantage was, when the other team would start the task i.e., 10 seconds apart from each leaders team.

Teams had to collect 5 balls, at least 2 of each Red(hard asan) and Yellow(easy asan) from river to get the yoga asan stage to perform. The fastest team to do so and drink the Alofruit juice scored a point (Prince's team).

Prince won the task and received one star and his team became immune.

Fourth Task: Dung Se 
In this task, 14 non-immune Roadies along with Leaders - Raftaar, Neha and Nikhil will compete to earn 7 immunities. And the 5 immune Roadies along with Rannvijay and Prince will participate to steal immunity from them.

73 dung cake were needed by the immune team to steal 1 immunity.

At the Vote-out, the non- Immune Roadies voted for one of them, who they think needs immunity, with 3 votes being the majority Sapna received 1 immunity. The other 3 immunities where chosen by Raftaar, Nikhil and Neha. They choose Jayant, Arushi and Pratibha respectively.

Fifth Task: EDM Task (Entertainment, Dance, Message) 
After the vote-out, the Leaders choose 1 Roadie each as team captains, then the team captains would have to make their team before the Task.

The best performing team will win immunity for the entire team and the team with the highest popularity from the live audience will win 2 immunities.

Nikhil won the task and received one star and his team became immune. Prince received the most flags and beads and won 3 immunities for his team.

At the Double Vote-out, Kakoli and Sapna received the most votes and were eliminated. Later, Raftaar had to leave the journey temporarily for his new album release. Varun Sood came as substitution Leader for Raftaar.

Journey - Tauli Village -Episode 18 
The Leaders and the Roadies stayed close to the Anirudh Ashram in Tauli Village.

In the morning, they helped the locals to make pencils, baskets and danced with the locals.

Journey - Rupnagar  Episode 18 to 23

Sixth Task: Hadippa Games 
The four Team Captains chosen by the Leaders in the last Vote-out, had to make their teams before the task.

Roadies will compete in various tasks. In each stage, the 1st placer will get 3 points, the 2nd placer will get 2 points, the 3rd placer will get 1 point. The final stage will be competed by the top 2 teams. 

Prince won the task and received one star and his team became immune. Varun came second and received an advantage.

In Episode 20, Bhawish Madaan, Taniya Husain, Prakhar Narayan and Poonam Shah entered as Battleground Finalists.

At the Surprise Double Vote-out, Arushi and Apoorva received the most votes but will get a chance to compete against each other and come-back in the journey.

Seventh Task: This is Eent! 
The four Battleground Finalists and the two recently voted-out will compete in 2 teams. The winning team will join the journey and the other team Roadies will be eliminated.

Team A won and Arushi, Prakhar, Poonam entered in the journey. Team B - Apoorva, Bhawish and Taniya were eliminated.

But Apoorva later to re-enter in game, as Prince gave one of his star for her to stay in the game.

Eighth Task: Halke Me Mat Lo 
The Leaders had to choose a second Roadie for their team, to compete along with their Team Captains before the task.

In this Task, Roadies competed in two teams: Favourites (Roadies chosen by Leaders) vs. Underdogs (Roadies not chosen by Leaders). The winning team will get eight immunities.

Only 8 of the 10 Roadies in Underdogs Team could participate. Roadies had to vote for one who they think should not compete. Here are the votes: 

Zabi & Shrishti did not compete and were sent back to the Camp-site.

Underdogs won the task and received eight immunities.

Ninth Task: Castrol Power 1 Task 
In this Task, Underdogs will have to defend their immunities whereas other Roadies will get to steal 3 immunities. Only 3 Roadies from each team will get to compete.

Favourites won the task and stole 3 immunities from the Underdogs.

Journey - Heritage Gurly Village  Episode 24 
The Leaders stayed in the Heritage Gully Village House and the Roadies stayed in a close by Hostel in Heritage Guly Village.

In the morning, they helped the locals in sewing and danced with the locals.

Before they left to the next destination, there was a Surprise Vote-out, where Kevin and Shisti received the most votes and were Voted-out.

Due to COVID-19 pandemic in India, the Roadies Journey was paused and everyone were sent home.

Journey - Bio Bubble Episode 25 to 36 
6 months later, the journey resumed with all safety mesaure in a Bio Bubble.

Shreya Kalra the winner of first ever digital LIVE Auditions, joined the Roadies Journey.

Prince Narula couldn't join the Journey, so Akash & Aproova have all the responsibility of the Team.

Tenth Task: Roadies Premier League 
Before this Task, 3 Leaders & Prince's Team Captain had to take Roadies to form Teams. The winner of the task will win a chance of getting immunity and the Leader will get a Star.

Team Nikhil won the Oppo Advantage and had the power to decide the order of the Teams.

Team Nikhil won the Task and received a star. And each Roadie from his team will have to choose one other Roadie to challenge, the winner will then win immunity.

Eleventh Task: Lights Out 
Before this Task, each Roadie from the winning team in 10th Task chose one Roadie to challenge.

Leaders had a chance to bet on any of the Challenger Roadie or their opponent. They will have to bet their and if they win the bet they will get two stars. Only Varun bet on Michael. 

Hamid, Poonam, Abhimanyu and Michael won the Task and received Immunity.

Varun won the bet and received a star.

At the Double Vote-out, Prakhar and Pratibha received the most votes and were voted-out. But Neha gave away her only Star to save her Team Captain Pratibha from getting Voted-out and Pratibha was back in the journey. Tarandeep as the next highest voted Roadie, was voted-out.

Twelfth Task: Basket Brawl 
Before this Task, 3 Leaders & Prince's Team Captain had to team-up of 2 Leaders. The winners of the task will win immunity for all the Roadies in their team and both the Leaders will get a Star.

Nikhil & Varun teamed-up and Neha had to team-up with PrinceThen the Leaders had to pick 4 more Roadies to finish their Teams.  

Sanjay was not chosen by any of the Leaders to be in their Team, therefore he was directly in the danger zone in the next Vote-out.

Team Neha & Prince won the Task and received a star each. All Roadies in their team won immunity.

At the Vote-out, Pratibha was ejected due to physical violence against Arushi and Nisha during the previous task. In the Vote-out twist, the non-immune Roadies had to pair-up and pair that received the most votes were Arushi and Sanjay, but will get a chance to compete against each other in the survival task and come-back in the journey.

Thirteenth Task: Drone Survivor 
Arushi and Sanjay had to choose 3 Roadies to compete with them and the winner will become the "Lone Survivor" and be back in the journey. 

In the Survival task Sanjay won the task and re-entered in the journey and Arushi got eliminated.

At a Surprise Vote-out, each Leader had to have 2 members in their Teams.

Fourteenth Task: Win to Vote 
Before the Task, each team had to have 2 members in their Teams.

Aman, Hamid, Sanjay, Vipin and Zabi and Hamid were not chosen by any Leader and had to compete in different stages to win votes.

Hamid was injured from previous Task, Abhimanyu participate as proxy for Hamid. 

In the Vote-out, Sanjay received the most votes and was voted-out.

Aman, Hamid, Vipin and Zabi survived and got to choose their Team.

Final Teams

Fifteenth Task: Envy Gong Wrong 
Leader Prince joined the Journey.

The winners of the task will win immunity for all the Roadies in their team and the Leaders will get a Star. The 2nd place team will win 1 immunity Shreya swap with Kevin in nikhil team to Varun team. 

Team Nikhil won the Task and received a star and all Roadies in his team were immuned. Team Neha came 2nd and won 1 immunity.

At the Vote-out, Nisha received the most votes and was voted-out. Apoorva and Akash received equal votes and Leader Prince had to decide to save 1 of them by giving away a Star. He saved Akash and Apoorva was eliminated.

Sixteenth Task: Dumb Laga Ke Charades 
Before the task, the Leaders had to team-up. The winners of the task will win 3 immunities for Roadies in their team and 1 Roadie from the losing team will directly get eliminated.

Neha & Prince teamed-up and Nikhil had to team-up with Varun.  

Team Nikhil & Varun won the Task and won 3 immunities for their team.

Team Neha & Prince lost the Task and had to eliminate 1 of their Team member. Neha & Prince had to mutually decide to eliminate 1 of the 5 Roadies in their Team. They chose Aman and he was eliminated.

Seventeenth Task: Ticket to Finale 
Before the task, the winning team from 16th Task's Leaders Varun & Nikhil had to immune 3 Roadies in their teams.

Nikhil gave immunity to Michael & Varun gave immunity to Jayant and Neha & Prince gave immunity to Hamid.

Michael, Hamid & Jayant had to choose 1 Leader to compete with. The winner will win Ticket to Finale.  

Hamid won the Task and became the 1st Finalist.

At the Last Vote-out, Shreya received the most votes and was Voted-out. But whom she voted for would also get Voted-out. She voted for Abhimanyu Raghav. Zabi, one of Abhimanyu's closest friends believed that Abhimanyu deserved it more than him so he chose to switch places. But the final choice stood with Shreya and she chose to switch her vote from Abhimanyu to Zabi.

Eighteenth Task: OPPO Battle Stars 
Before the task, the 6 Roadies competing had to choose they want to challenge. Ex-roadies Arushi & Aman returned to perform in this Task.  

The first 2 Roadies out of the 6 Semi-Finalist Roadies to earn 5 Stars will become Finalists.  

Jayant & Michael won the Task and became Finalists.

After the Task, few Ex-Roadies returned to cheer the Finalists.

Nineteenth Task: Finale Task 
The 3 Finalists - Hamid, Jayant and Michael competed in the Final Task.

Hamid was the first one to perform the task. He was followed by Michael and then Jayant respectively.

Hamid Barkzi won the Task and become the Winner of Roadies Revolution. Michael Ajay & Jayant Yadav were the Runners-up.

Vote out order

Notes

Voting History 

 Indicates the contestant was immune that week.
 Indicates the contestant was in the danger that week.
 Indicates the contestant was voted-out that week, but had the chance to compete to return.
 Indicates the contestant was eliminated outside vote out that week.
 Indicates the contestant was voted-out that week.
 Indicates the contestant was a Battleground entry.
 Indicates the contestant was a Facebook audition entry.
 The contestant was ejected from the competition
 Indicates the contestant wild card entry in the competition.
 Indicates the decision was taken by the other Leaders for the Leader's absence.
 Indicates the contestants were eliminated in semi-finals.
 Indicates the contestant is the runner up.
 Indicates the contestant won the competition.

Notes

Controversy 
Neha Dhupia came under heat for some comments she made during the audition of Karan Kapoor in Pune. During the audition Kapoor shared an anecdote with the judges about slapping his girlfriend who was being disloyal to him by being with five other men at the time of being in a monogamous relationship with him. Dhupia confronted Kapoor aggressively by saying it's her choice justifying cheating. Dhupia, alongside Chinapa and Narula, had on a previous season of Roadies commended a girl who slapped four boys during her relationships with them. As the episode aired in India the audiences took to Twitter to express disdain for Dhupia's actions. #FakeFeminism was trending in India for several days with viewers terming Dhupia "fake feminist" and accusing her of being sexist towards men. The incident received widespread backlash and a slurry of abuses and memes poured in over the internet for Dhupia. The matter was picked up by major news outlets which emphasized that Dhupia was blaming the victim while promoting promiscuity in the name of "women empowerment". Dhupia released a statement standing by her actions while condemning domestic violence in relationships.

References

External links 
 Web Episodes on Voot
 MTV Roadies On MXPlayer

MTV Roadies
2020 Indian television seasons
2021 Indian television seasons